Congelin is a locality in the Wheatbelt region of Western Australia, north of Williams. It is located within the Shire of Williams.

History
The townsite was requested by the 14 Mile Brook Progress Association in 1911. The name, derived from a nearby pool, is of Aboriginal origin but its meaning is unknown. Gazetted in 1913, the town did not develop and to this day remains a sparsely populated agricultural area on the edge of the Darling Scarp. Plans by the Shire of Williams to seal its part of the Congelin-Narrogin road are in progress.

References

Towns in Western Australia
Wheatbelt (Western Australia)